The Wilson High School Gymnasium is a historic school athletic facility at Main and Lee Streets in Wilson, Arkansas.  Built in 1948 and used until 1965, this large single-story Art Deco brick building is a remarkably well-preserved facility (despite having sat largely vacant and unused since 1965), with original floors, bleachers, and equipment such as basketball hoops and scoreboards.  The pool at the rear of the building retains original tile work.

The building was listed on the National Register of Historic Places in 2015.

See also
National Register of Historic Places listings in Mississippi County, Arkansas

References

Sports venues on the National Register of Historic Places in Arkansas
Art Deco architecture in Arkansas
Sports venues completed in 1948
National Register of Historic Places in Mississippi County, Arkansas
1948 establishments in Arkansas
Education in Mississippi County, Arkansas
School buildings completed in 1948
School buildings on the National Register of Historic Places in Arkansas
Gyms in the United States
Wilson, Arkansas